The billiards and snooker competitions at the 2019 Southeast Asian Games in Philippines were held at the Manila Hotel Tent.

Medal table

Medalists

Carom

Pool

Snooker

Results

Men’s 9-Ball Pool Singles

Last 18

Men’s 9-Ball Pool Doubles

Men’s 10-Ball Singles

Men’s Snooker Singles

Men’s Snooker Doubles

Men’s English Billiards Singles

Men's 1-Carom Cushion

Women’s 9-Ball Singles

Women’s 9-Ball Doubles

Women’s 10-Ball Singles

References

External links
 

2019 Southeast Asian Games events
Cue sports at the Southeast Asian Games